The 2017–18 season was the 129th season of competitive football in the Netherlands.

Promotion and relegation

Pre-season

League season

Eredivisie

Eerste divisie

Tweede Divisie

Derde Divisie

Saturday League

Sunday League

Hoofdklasse

Saturday A League

Saturday B League

Sunday A League

Sunday B League

Eerste Klasse

Eredivisie (women)

Managerial changes

KNVB Cup

National teams

Netherlands national football team

2018 FIFA World Cup qualification

Netherlands women's national football team

Diary of the season

Deaths

Retirements

References

 
Seasons in Dutch football
N
N